The O.C., also known as The Club, is an American professional wrestling stable currently signed to WWE. The group performs on the Raw brand and is composed of leader AJ Styles, Luke Gallows, Karl Anderson, and Mia Yim. Their team name is derived from a previous catchphrase: "the official, the original, the only club that matters" due to the three original members being from the Bullet Club.

Previously working in New Japan Pro-Wrestling as members of Bullet Club, the trio of Styles, Gallows, and Anderson reunited in WWE in May 2016 as The Club, before splitting two months later. They would officially reunite in July 2019 and were renamed The O.C.. The team split again in April 2020 when Gallows and Anderson were released from WWE but reformed upon their return to the company in October 2022 with Yim joining the group the following month.

Background

From 2014 to 2016, AJ Styles, Luke Gallows (under the name Doc Gallows), and Karl Anderson were members of Bullet Club, primarily appearing in the Japanese promotion New Japan Pro-Wrestling (NJPW). In NJPW, Styles was a two-time IWGP Heavyweight Champion, and Gallows and Anderson were three-time IWGP Tag Team Champions. Styles departed from the promotion in January 2016, followed by Gallows and Anderson in February. After their departures, there were weeks of speculation and teasing from WWE themselves about the trio signing with WWE.

History

Initial run as The Club (2016–2018)
 
At the 2016 Royal Rumble, AJ Styles debuted for WWE in the Royal Rumble match. A few months later on the April 11, 2016, episode of Raw, Luke Gallows and Karl Anderson then made their WWE debut as a team, attacking The Usos (Jey Uso and Jimmy Uso), establishing themselves as heels in the process and with the duo's NJPW background being acknowledged by WWE announcers. On the following week's Raw, WWE began teasing an alliance between Gallows and Anderson and their former Bullet Club stablemate Styles when, after meeting Styles in a backstage interview, Gallows and Anderson attacked his Payback opponent Roman Reigns in the ring; Styles, however, did not seem pleased with the attack. Over the next few weeks, Gallows and Anderson continued teasing an uneasy alliance with Styles, while having several face offs with The Usos and Roman Reigns, including at Payback, where the two failed in their attempt to help Styles capture the WWE World Heavyweight Championship from Reigns. On the May 9 episode of Raw, the trio of Styles, Gallows, and Anderson was dubbed "The Club" (a reference to their former NJPW stable, Bullet Club). The Club disbanded two weeks later on Raw, when Styles stated that he wanted an amicable separation from Gallows and Anderson, blaming them and The Usos for his failure to win the WWE World Heavyweight Championship at the previous day's Extreme Rules. Though Styles stated that the three could remain "brothers", Gallows and Anderson refused and ended the friendship altogether. On the May 30 episode of Raw, Gallows and Anderson entered the WWE Tag Team Championship picture by attacking reigning champions The New Day (Big E, Kofi Kingston, and Xavier Woods), while later in the show, Styles turned on the returning John Cena and reunited with Gallows and Anderson. This set up a match between Styles and Cena at Money in the Bank on June 19, which Styles won after interference from The Club. On July 19, The Club was split up in the WWE draft, with Gallows and Anderson being drafted to the Raw brand and Styles to SmackDown, which resulted in them wrestling their last match together as a trio on July 24 at Battleground in a loss against Cena, Enzo Amore, and Big Cass.

Gallows and Anderson were both drafted to SmackDown in the 2018 Superstar Shake-up, where they made a one-off reunion with Styles on the April 24, 2018, episode of SmackDown Live as faces, in a losing effort to Shinsuke Nakamura, Aiden English, and Rusev. After an unsuccessful stint on the SmackDown brand, Gallows and Anderson returned to the Raw brand on April 29, 2019, losing to The Usos. At that point, they had not won a match on television since they defeated The Usos in May 2018. Throughout the following weeks, Styles frustratingly encouraged Gallows and Anderson to be the successful duo they once were.

Reformation as The O.C. (2019–2020)
On the July 1, 2019, episode of Raw, Gallows and Anderson encouraged Styles to be the guy he once was in NJPW. After Styles lost a United States Championship match to Ricochet, Gallows and Anderson helped Styles to beat up Ricochet, and reuniting The Club as heels. Two weeks later at Extreme Rules, Styles, accompanied by The Club, won his third United States Championship by defeating Ricochet. On the July 22 episode of Raw, The Club was renamed "The O.C." and repeatedly claimed that they were the "official, original, and only club that matters". The following week, Gallows and Anderson won their second Raw Tag Team Championship, making all members of The O.C. champions, but they lost the titles on the August 19 episode of Raw to Seth Rollins and Braun Strowman, ending their reign at 21 days. At Crown Jewel on October 31, Gallows and Anderson won the nine-team tag team turmoil match to win the WWE Tag Team World Cup and be called "the best tag team in the world". Styles also retained his U.S. title against Humberto Carrillo at the event.

The O.C. would have unfortunate luck at Survivor Series; during the Kickoff pre-show, Gallows and Anderson were eliminated from the interbrand tag team battle royal, and on the main show, Styles lost the interbrand triple threat match, in which he faced SmackDown's Intercontinental Champion Shinsuke Nakamura and NXT North American Champion Roderick Strong, where Strong stole the victory from Styles after Styles had performed a Phenomenal Forearm on Nakamura and Strong threw Styles out of the ring and pinned Nakamura. The O.C. would again have bad luck on the following night's Raw as during Styles' championship match against Rey Mysterio, Gallows and Anderson were ejected from ringside and Styles ultimately lost his U.S. title to Mysterio thanks to help from Randy Orton. All members of The O.C. would enter the 2020 Royal Rumble, with Styles entering at 18, Anderson at 20, and Gallows at 24, but they were all eliminated. At Super ShowDown in February, Gallows and Anderson took out Mysterio in an attempt to help Styles win the Tuwaiq Mountain Trophy Gauntlet match, but The Undertaker in turn took out Gallows and Anderson, and then took Mysterio's spot in the gauntlet match and defeated Styles to win the trophy, thus beginning a feud with Undertaker. Styles then faced Aleister Black at Elimination Chamber in a no disqualification match, but would lose after The Undertaker came out and took out Gallows and Anderson and chokeslammed Styles, allowing Black to hit Black Mass and win the match. Styles would then face The Undertaker in the main event of the first night of WrestleMania 36 in a Boneyard match, but would lose despite interference from Gallows and Anderson (this would end up being Undertaker's final match).

On April 15, 2020, the stable was dissolved when Gallows and Anderson were released from their WWE contracts as part of budget cuts stemming from the COVID-19 pandemic, while Styles formed a tag team with Omos a short time later.

Return and feud with The Judgment Day (2022–present)
After a two year absence, Gallows and Anderson returned to WWE on the October 10, 2022, episode of Raw, reuniting The O.C. with Styles as faces. They attacked former Bullet Club leader Finn Bálor and his stable, The Judgment Day (including Damian Priest and Dominik Mysterio), as Bálor had issued Styles an ultimatum to join his group, whereby Styles refused and brought in Gallows and Anderson as his backup. The following week, a six-man tag team match between the stables was scheduled for Crown Jewel on November 5. At the event, The O.C. lost to The Judgment Day after interference from Rhea Ripley. On the November 7, episode of Raw, Mia Yim, returning to WWE herself that night, aligned with The O.C. to counter Ripley. At Survivor Series WarGames on November 26, Styles defeated Bálor while Yim's team defeated Ripley's team in a WarGames match. On the following episode of Raw, The O.C. was defeated by The Judgment Day in an eight-person mixed tag team match to end their feud.

Sub-groups

Current

Championships and accomplishments
New Japan Pro-Wrestling
 NEVER Openweight Championship (1 time) – Anderson
WWE
 WWE Championship (1 time) – Styles
 WWE United States Championship (1 time) – Styles
WWE Raw Tag Team Championship (1 time) – Gallows and Anderson
 WWE Tag Team World Cup (2019) – Gallows and Anderson

Notes

References

External links
 
 
 

Bullet Club members
WWE teams and stables